Intelligent device management is a technology used for enterprise software applications that allow equipment manufacturers to monitor and manage remote equipment, systems and products via the Internet.  Another term for intelligent device management is remote device management (RDM) while strategic service management describes the service.

IDM extends IT service management to on-site devices and can support standard service processes, such as  Incident, Problem, Change, Configuration Management as defined by ITIL.

This technology is commonly used by ATM, security and self-service kiosk companies.

See also 
Machine to machine
Control system
HVAC control system
Control engineering
Lighting control system
Intelligent building
Self-service kiosk

External links 
Machine 2 Enterprise - Blog on Building Management Systems

Business software
Information technology management